Campaign Trail: The Game of Presidential Elections is a board game published in 1983 by Game Designers' Workshop.

Contents
Campaign Trail is a game in which players run the campaigns for their candidates by collecting votes as they move their tokens around the board.

Reception
Alan R. Moon reviewed Campaign Trail for Games International magazine and stated, "I find this game a little boring and long to keep my interest."

Other recognition
A copy of this game is held in the collection of the Strong National Museum of Play (object 117.765).

References

Board games introduced in 1983
Game Designers' Workshop games